NGC 2020 is an HII Region surrounding the Wolf-Rayet star BAT99-59. It is located in the Large Magellanic Cloud.

The nebula was discovered on 30 December 1836 by John Herschel. Together with NGC 2014 it makes up what is called the Cosmic Reef.

References

External links 
 

H II regions
Large Magellanic Cloud
Dorado (constellation)
2020